South Korean singer Jun. K has released nine extended plays and eleven singles. He is known as the main vocalist of the boy group 2PM.

His 2nd Japanese solo album Love Letter ranked 1st on both Billboard Japan "Top" and "Hot" album sales charts. His first Korean solo album Mr. No♡ debuted at No. 09 on Billboard World Albums chart. His 3rd Japanese solo album No Shadow ranked 2nd on Billboard Japan "Top" and "Hot" album sales charts. His fourth Japanese album No Time ranked number three on the Oricon daily sales chart.

Extended plays

Singles

Soundtrack appearances and collaborations

Songwriting and composing credits

References

Discographies of South Korean artists
K-pop discographies